Gilles Simon was the defending champion, but lost in the semifinals to Lukáš Rosol.
Rosol went on to win his first ATP World Tour title of his career, defeating Guillermo García López in the final, 6–3, 6–2.

Seeds
The top four seeds receive a bye into the second round.

Draw

Finals

Top half

Bottom half

Qualifying

Seeds

Qualifiers

Lucky loser
 ''' Filippo Volandri

Draw

First qualifier

Second qualifier

Third qualifier

Fourth qualifier

References
 Main Draw
 Qualifying Draw

BRD Nastase Tiriac Trophyandnbsp;- Singles
2013 Singles